"Seize the Day" is a power ballad by American heavy metal band Avenged Sevenfold. It was released on July 11, 2006, as a promotional single for their third studio album, City of Evil. Additionally, the song was released on 27 July 2010, as a downloadable track for the video game Rock Band 2, along with "Nightmare" and "Scream".

Music video
The video depicts a couple in love and expecting a child. Matt's friends (the rest of Avenged Sevenfold) come to his house to make plans to rob a liquor store. In the process, Matt gets caught by the police while the others drive off, leaving him behind. Matt goes to jail, where after Matt's wife comes to visit him. They get into a fight; while driving home his wife is hit by a van. A funeral scene follows, and her casket is lowered into the ground; Synyster Gates is shown playing the song's guitar solo on top of her casket. At the end of the video, Matt is at her grave, with their son, who had survived the crash, and is also standing over her grave when the rest of the band come over to him. Matt picks up his son, and they all walk away. 

The video tells a story, similar to the Guns N' Roses' video "November Rain". M. Shadows said, "It's not us driving around in cool cars and just chilling, you know? It has a story and Guns N' Roses did those videos the best. It wasn't about looking cool and being flashy, it was about being real and showing the scenario and being true to the video." They also made a remake of the video from the band Anderson's song "Trial and Temptation", where they go and rob the store. The girl in the video is Matt's wife in real life. 

In 2007, the video won a Metal Hammer Golden Gods Award for Best Video.

Track listing

Personnel
Personnel listing as adapted from album liner notes.

Avenged Sevenfold
 M. Shadows – lead vocals, backing vocals
 Zacky Vengeance – acoustic guitar, rhythm guitar, co-lead guitar, backing vocals,
 The Rev – drums, piano, backing vocals
 Synyster Gates – lead guitar, backing vocals
 Johnny Christ – bass, backing vocals

Production
Produced by Mudrock and Avenged Sevenfold, with additional production by Fred Archambault and Scott Gilman
Mixed by Andy Wallace
Pro Tools by John O'Mahony, assisted by Steve Sisco
Mastered by Eddie Schreyer
Additional vocal production by The Rev, Synyster Gates and M. Shadows
Orchestration by Scott Gilman, The Rev, Synyster Gates and M. Shadows
Drum tech – Mike Fasano
Guitar tech – Stephen Ferrara-Grand

Orchestra
Violinists – Samuel Fischer (soloist), Mark Robertson, Songa Lee-Kitto, Sam Formicola, Bruce Dukov, Alan Grunfeld, Larry Greenfield, Liane Mautner
Violists – David Walther, Matthew Funes, Alma Fernandez
Cellists – Victor Lawrence (soloist), David Low, David Mergen

Choir
Choir leader – Jeannine Wagner
Choir performers – Zachary Biggs, Colton Beyer-Johnson, Josiah Yiu, Nathan Cruz, Stephen Cruz, C.J. Cruz, Sean Sullivan, Alan Hong, Nico Walsh, Sally Stevens

References

External links
 Seize the Day official music video on YouTube.com

2006 singles
Avenged Sevenfold songs
Rock ballads
Music videos directed by Wayne Isham